Gwen Barringer (29 July 1882 – 26 August 1960) was a South Australian artist, known for her watercolours.

Barringer was noted for watercolours of flowers and landscapes, to which she invested a fairyland-like glamour and remained immune to trends and changing fashions. In 1928 following an extensive sketching tour of Europe she held a solo exhibition in Adelaide which achieved a near record sale (over £1000) for an Australian woman. She died in Adelaide on 26 August 1960 after a long illness. She is represented in the State galleries of South Australia and Victoria, and the National Gallery, Canberra.

Barringer studied at the South Australian School of Arts and Crafts under H. P. Gill, Archibald Collins and Hans Heysen. She was a council member of the South Australian Society of Arts for over 30 years, and was also well known as a teacher.

Barringer Street in the Canberra suburb of Conder is named in her honour, as well as her sister-in-law Ethel.

Family
Barringer was born Gwendoline L'Avence Adamson, her parents being Adam and Kate Emma Adamson (née Kentish, 1861 – 27 December 1941) in the inner Adelaide suburb of Harrowville, Adelaide. Her grandfather was a brother of James Hazel Adamson (1829–1902), a prominent artist of early South Australia.

She married Herbert Page Barringer (also a watercolourist) on 18 November 1910 at Christ Church, North Adelaide, unsuccessfully seeking a divorce in 1930 and later divorcing him in 1937.

Herbert Barringer's sister Ethel Barringer was an artist of some note.

Selected works
Port Adelaide (ca. 1920) Carrick Hill collection.

References

1882 births
1960 deaths
Artists from Adelaide
Australian women painters
20th-century Australian painters
20th-century Australian women artists
19th-century Australian women